The 2nd constituency of Budapest is one of the single member constituencies of the National Assembly, the national legislature of Hungary. The constituency standard abbreviation: Budapest 02. OEVK.

Since 2022, it has been represented by Anna Orosz of the Momentum party.

Geography
The 2nd constituency is located in south-western part of Buda.

The constituency borders with 3rd constituency to the north, 1st constituency to the northeast, 6th constituency to the southeast, 18th constituency to the south and 2nd constituency of Pest County to the west.

List of districts
The constituency includes the following municipalities:

 District XI.: Main (inner) part of the district (except Nándorkert, Albertfalva, Kelenvölgy and Péterhegy).

History
The 2nd constituency of Budapest was created in 2011 and contained of the pre-2011 abolished constituencies of the part of 15th, 16th and 17th constituency of the capital. Its borders have not changed since its creation.

Members
The constituency was first represented by István Simicskó of the KDNP from 2014 to 2022. He was succeeded by Anna Orosz of the Momentum Movement in 2022 (with United for Hungary support).

Election result

2022 election

2018 election

2014 election

Notes

References

Budapest 2nd